The Navigator is the sixth studio album by American indie rock band Hurray for the Riff Raff. It was released by ATO Records on March 10, 2017. The album was recorded in 2016 at Electric Lady Studios in New York City and Panoramic House in West Marin with producer Paul Butler, a member of the band The Bees.

Background
By the end of 2014, Hurray for the Riff Raff had managed to gain a wider audience following the successes of Small Town Heroes. Rather than immediately follow it up quickly by recording another album, frontperson Alynda Mariposa Segarra used the opportunity to travel back to their ancestral homelands in Puerto Rico and reconnect with their roots. Much of the album was inspired by their travels. They witnessed the effects that both the debt crisis and continual environmental damage had done to the communities, as well as the way Puerto Rican culture had continued to flourish despite the hardships that had been endured.

Segarra also returned to their childhood hometown in The Bronx to see how gentrification had affected the area since they had left to start their music career. These changes would also become central to the themes covered within the album. After returning from their travels, Segarra and the rest of the band decided to relocate from New Orleans to Nashville in order to start writing the new album.

Writing and recording 
Segarra conceived The Navigator with a storyline following the protagonist Navita in an overgentrified city in the future. They based the character on themself as a 16-year old street kid. As They later told Drowned in Sound:

Once writing the album had been completed, the band then spent most of 2016 recording the album at Electric Lady Studios in New York and Panoramic House in West Marin. The band asked Paul Butler to produce the album, based on his work with British soul singer Michael Kiwanuka. Butler was hired with the aim to recapture the same sound he had brought to Kirwanuka's albums and combine it with the various musical influences of the places Segarra had visited. To accomplish the task an ensemble of musicians were brought in, including percussionist Juan-Carlos Chaurand and Devendra Banhart's drummer Gregory Rogove.

Segarra said, "I was listening to Kendrick Lamar a lot during the making of The Navigator. I started writing the lyrics for [the title] track on my phone, with no music. That's the part of the album where Navita starts to transform. I wanted it to sound very cinematic. I listened to a lot of Jorge Ben Jor too, especially his album Força Bruta. The strings on that album are gorgeous."

Release and promotion 
The album was announced on December 5, 2016 alongside the release of the video for lead single 'Rican Beach'. Details on the tour to support the album were also listed, as well as a statement from Segarra regarding the album. In the statement Segarra wrote, "This is dedicated to the water protectors of Standing Rock—thank you for your bravery and giving us hope. Also, to the people of Peñuelas, Puerto Rico, who are demanding an end to the AES dumping of coal ash which leads to water contamination—we are with you."

Two additional songs were taken from the album in order to promote it. The first of these two songs, 'Hungry Ghost' was released on January 6, 2017. Following the album's release in March, the final single - 'Living in the City' was unveiled on August 29, 2017.

For the Billboard charting week of April 1, 2017, The Navigator was the No. 2 album sold in the breaking-and-entry category by the Heatseekers Albums. In addition, the album was the No. 9 most sold Independent Albums, and it was the No. 7 most sold Top Tastemaker Albums. It also sold enough copies to attain No. 43 on the Top Rock Albums chart.

Critical reception

The Navigator received positive appraisal from music critics upon release. At Metacritic, the album holds a score of an 83 out of 100 based upon 18 selected independent ratings and reviews, which indicates "universal acclaim".

At AllMusic, Stephen Thomas Erlewine wrote, "The Navigator is nothing if it isn't a bold risk, a record that attempts to carve out a new kind of Americana, one where the past informs the present instead of the present preserving the past -- and one where the political is personal, too." Caroline Sullivan was similarly positive in her review for The Guardian stating; "Segarra personalises the political by foregrounding her Hispanic roots. If that sounds as if it’s a recipe for unmitigated worthiness, be assured that folk melodies and wild-hearted Latin beats play as big a role as Segarra’s flamethrower polemics" Writing for The Independent, Andy Gill claimed, "[Segarra] effectively expands the notion of Americana to accommodate another cultural strain alongside the usual blues and country influences."

Writing for NME, Leonie Cooper said, "Serious stuff for sure, but doesn’t deliver its message with a po-face. ‘Living in The City’ is a fun doo-wop number while the title track is a sultry slice of mid-1980s Tom Waits-ian southern gothic. Hurray for the Riff Raff indeed." Kitty Empire also praised the album in a five-star review for The Observer: "The Navigator might be full of site-specific anger and yearning, but like its predecessors, it is incredibly easy on the ear. The songs just flow--slinky, sad or elegant in their own ways." In a review for Pitchfork, contributor Matthew Ismael Ruiz commended the album too, commenting that "The Navigator is ostensibly a rock’n’roll record, but it expands Segarra’s palette beyond the folk/country/blues lane she’s thus far occupied."

In the review for Q, Andrew Perry felt that "The Navigator feels like a mighty, empowering antidote to 2017's many spiritual agonies." Laura Snapes' article for Uncut also related the album to the contemporary political climate: "Segarra is skilled at identifying the shifting goalposts that immigrants have to live by, and staring past them." Writing for Rolling Stone, editor Will Hermes simply stated, "This is proudly intersectional folk music". For Vice, Robert Christgau named "Living in the City", "Pa'lante", and "Rican Beach" as highlights while writing of Segarra, "Bronx Puerto Rican emigrates to New Orleans, where she crystallizes a rock group fit to declaim her story".

Track listing

 The audio at the beginning of "The Navigator" is a clip commonly heard in Latin America (especially Mexico City)
 "Pa'lante" includes lines and audio of Pedro Pietri's poem, "Puerto Rican Obituary"

Personnel

Hurray for the Riff Raff 
Alynda Mariposa Segarra – vocals, guitar, percussion, piano
Caitlin Gray – bass, upright piano, vocals
Jordan Hyde – guitar
Greg Rogove –Drums
Paul Butler –Keys, guitar
Juan Carlos Chaurand – Congas and bongos

Additional musicians 
Juan-Carlos Chaurand – bongos, congas
Claudia Chopek – viola, violin
Mthakathi Ema – vocals
Phil Granito – vocals
Norka Hernandez – drums
Joel Katz – vocals
Gregory Rogove – drums, percussion, vocals
Jose Santiago – drums
Patricia Santos – cello
Jonathan Troncoso – drums
Yva Las Vegass – guitar, vocals

Production 
Beatriz Artola – engineer
Michael H. Brauer – mixing
Paul Butler – drums, guitar, percussion, producer, synthesizer, vocals
Phil Joly – engineer
Jon Kaplan – mixing
Barry McCready – assistant engineer
Jon McMullen – engineer
Seth Paris – assistant engineer
Doug Van Sloun – mastering
Steve Vealey – mixing

Artwork 
Ricardo Alessio – art direction
Sarrah Danziger – photography
Maria Silver – artwork, design

Charts

References

External links 
 

2017 albums
Hurray for the Riff Raff albums
ATO Records albums